NantOmics is a biotechnology company based in Culver City, California, which provides molecular diagnostic products for personalized cancer treatment. It is part of the NantWorks network, a corporation consisting of different startups in the medical and health industry.

History 
NantOmics was founded in 2013 by billionaire Patrick Soon-Shiong. In 2015 NantOmics bought the cancer diagnostics company OncoPlex Dx. In 2017 the company acquired the consumer genomics startup Genos.

In 2016 the company's revenue was about $58.3 million with a net loss of about $72.00 million. As of 2017, the company is classified as a unicorn startup with an estimated value of over $1 billion. NantHealth, Inc. held a 13.6% minority interest in the company at the end of 2021.

Products 
GPS Cancer involves sequencing of the genome and RNA of tumor cells in comparison to normal cells from the same individual in order to develop personalized treatments. About 327,000 cancer patients participated in a GPS cancer pilot project in 2017.

References 

Biotechnology companies of the United States
Biotechnology companies established in 2013
Companies based in Culver City, California
2013 establishments in California